Nikhri is a Yadav village in Gurgaon Mandal in Rewari District in Haryana State, India. Other towns in the area include Dharuhera. The main language of the village is Ahirvati. It is also named as Nikhari.

Demographics
As of 2011 India census, Nikhri had a population of 1500 in 300 households. Males (770) constitute 51.95%  of the population and females (730) 48.04%. Nikhri has an average literacy(911) rate of 72.58%, lower than the national average of 74%: male literacy(670) is 58.39%, and female literacy(630) is 41.6% of total literates (911). In Nikhri, 9.96% of the population is under 6 years of age (125).

Nikhri Village Industrial Area 
Nikhri Village Industrial Area has several factories are located around Nikhri.

Education
There are many government and private schools, the former being managed by the Government of Haryana through the Haryana Board of School Education (HBSE).

Connectivity
Nikhri lies on National Highway 48 and is served by many local buses and states Roadways buses and trains plying on this route. The nearest railway station is Rewari Junction; a major station is at Rewari.

Rajiv Gandhi Herbal Park and Nature Camp, Sahabi  Barrage 
Rajiv Gandhi Herbal Park and Nature Camp, Sahabi  Barrage was set up in 2011 by Government of Haryana at Sahabi  Barrage to promote eco-tourism. It includes a herbal conservation park, ayurveda center, wetlands and children park set up by the Forests Department, Haryana. It also has log huts accommodation, tree houses, nature trails and dining facilities run by the Haryana Tourism.

Economy
Some of the industrial units functioning in Nikhri are: 
Poultry Farming 
Mahindra & Mahindra
JCB
Datsun

Adjacent villages
Dungarwas
Hansaka
Rasgan
Kharkhada
Masani
Khaliyawas-Titarpur
Jaunawas (jonawas) 
Niganiawas
Raliawas
Bhatsana

References 

Villages in Rewari district
Tourism in Haryana